The Lilstock Formation is a geologic formation in England. It preserves bivalve, insect and other invertebrate fossils, as well as fossil fish of Agkistracanthus mitgelensis and the basal theropod dinosaur Newtonsaurus cambrensis dating back to the Rhaetian of the Triassic period.

White Lias 
The White lias is a rare, fine-grained form of limestone from the late Triassic period, occurring only in certain parts of Somerset and infrequently in Warwickshire. It gets the name ‘lias’ from the quarrymen's dialect for ‘layers’, referring to its natural state when quarried.

White lias is part of the Langport Member of the Lilstock Formation, a multi-layered bed of stone formed from shale and limestone. At its base is a bone-bed yielding ancient marine, reptilian and ammonite fossils.

White lias varies in colour from white-cream to pale grey and is traditionally used for building and flooring. Evidence of its use can be seen in manor houses, churches and cathedrals all over the UK. It is most prevalent in the Somerset towns of Midsomer Norton, Radstock, Langport and Wincanton.
Bowdens quarry in Langport is the only supplier of white lias, and of the more commonly found blue lias and grey varieties.

See also 
 List of fossiliferous stratigraphic units in England

References

Further reading 
 P. B. Brodie. 1845. A History of the Fossil Insects in the Secondary Rocks of England Accompanied by a Particular Account of the Strata in which they Occur, and of the Circumstances Connected with their Preservation 1-130
 C. J. Duffin. 1994. Myriacanthid holocephalans (Chondrichthyes) from the British Late Triassic. Neues Jahrbuch für Geologie und Paläontologie, Abhandlungen 192(1):1-16

Geologic formations of England
Triassic System of Europe
Triassic England
Rhaetian Stage
Shale formations
Siltstone formations
Limestone formations
Mudstone formations
Paleontology in England
Geology of Somerset